Yang Huai (died 212) was a general military serving under Liu Zhang, ruler of Yi Province (present-day Sichuan and Chongqing), during the Three Kingdoms period of China.

Life
Little is known of Yang Huai except that he, along with Gao Pei (高沛), were assigned to guard the Boshui Pass (白水關) from Zhang Lu in case of a sudden attack. However, Liu Bei, along with Pang Tong´s second plan of taking control of Liu Zhang´s army`s in the north, then moving to capture Chengdu's capital, caught Yang and Gao off guard. Before reinforcements could arrive, Yang and Gao were executed because they were disrespectful to him. Liu Bei took the pass`s garrison into his army and proceeded to attack Fu County (涪縣; in present-day Fuling District, Chongqing).

In Romance of the Three Kingdoms
In the 14th-century historical novel Romance of the Three Kingdoms, the story was a little different. When Liu Bei arrived at the pass, both Yang Huai and Gao Pei had feigned their surrender and planned on assassinating Liu Bei; however, Pang Tong´s insight had revealed their intentions to Liu Bei, and Yang and Gao were executed.

Notes

References 

 Chen, Shou (3rd century). Records of the Three Kingdoms (Sanguozhi).
 Pei, Songzhi (5th century). Annotations to Records of the Three Kingdoms (Sanguozhi zhu).

Three Kingdoms 

2nd-century births
212 deaths
Executed Han dynasty people
Liu Zhang and associates
3rd-century executions
People executed by the Han dynasty